Firehouse is an American drama/adventure series that aired on ABC in early 1974. Somewhat derivative of Emergency! (a hit on rival network NBC at the time) and the recent best-selling book Report From Engine Co. 82 by FDNY fireman Dennis Smith, the series was set in Los Angeles at a small inner-city fire station.  The five-man crew of Engine Company 23 was led by Captain Spike Ryerson, played by James Drury, fresh from his starring role of nine years on the western series The Virginian.

Synopsis
The series follows a 1973 ABC Movie of the Week of the same name, although veteran character actor Richard Jaeckel was the only notable cast member to appear in both the TV-movie and the series.

It aired back-to-back with Chopper One, and ran only thirteen episodes.

Cast
 James Drury as Capt. Spike Ryerson
 Richard Jaeckel as Hank Myers
 Michael Delano as Sonny Caputo

Episodes

External links
Classic TV Archive: Firehouse
 

1974 American television series debuts
1974 American television series endings
American Broadcasting Company original programming
1970s American drama television series
American adventure television series
Television series by Metromedia
Television series by Spelling Television
Television series by CBS Studios
Television shows set in Los Angeles
Television series about firefighting
English-language television shows